The Ven James Royston (Roy) Beynon (16 September 1907 – 2 December 1991)  was an English Anglican priest.

He was educated at St Augustine's College, Canterbury and ordained in 1933. His early posts were in the North West Frontier: he served in Peshawar, Quetta and as Archdeacon of Lahore from 1947 to 1948. He was Vicar of Twyford from  1948 to 1973; Rural Dean of Winchester from 1958 to 1962; and Archdeacon of Winchester from 1962 to 1973.

He married Mildred née Fromings in 1933 : they had four daughters. They retired to London, Ontario. She pre-deceased him in 1986.

Notes

1907 births
Alumni of St Augustine's College, Canterbury
Archdeacons of Winchester (ancient)
Archdeacons of Lahore
1991 deaths